MPs in the first United Kingdom Parliament after the Union with Ireland, 1801 

This is a list of the MPs or Members of Parliament for the constituencies of the Parliament of the United Kingdom in 1801, which was the First Parliament of the United Kingdom after the Union with Ireland. The Parliament was created by co-opting members from the Irish Parliament into the British Parliament elected in 1796.



By-elections 
List of United Kingdom by-elections (1801–06)

See also
1796 British general election
List of parliaments of the United Kingdom
Members of the 1st UK Parliament from Ireland
Unreformed House of Commons

References

1802
1801 in the United Kingdom
1801